Frederick Wilkinson (born 1878) was an English professional footballer who played as an inside forward.

References

1878 births
Sportspeople from Bishop Auckland
Footballers from County Durham
English footballers
Association football inside forwards
Bishop Auckland F.C. players
Grimsby Town F.C. players
Norwich City F.C. players
Shildon A.F.C. players
Barnsley F.C. players
Darlington F.C. players
English Football League players
Year of death missing